The 2015–16 Nemzeti Bajnokság I (known as the K&H női kézilabda liga for sponsorship reasons) is the 65th season of the Nemzeti Bajnokság I, Hungarian premier Handball league.

Team information 

The following 12 clubs compete in the NB I during the 2015–16 season:

Personnel and kits
Following is the list of clubs competing in 2015–16 Nemzeti Bajnokság I, with their president, head coach, kit manufacturer and shirt sponsor.

Managerial changes

Regular season

Schedule and results

Playoffs 
Teams in bold won the playoff series. Numbers to the left of each team indicate the team's original playoff seeding. Numbers to the right indicate the score of each playoff game.

Quarterfinals

Győri Audi ETO KC won 66–45 on aggregate.

Érd won 64–61 on aggregate.

FTC-Rail Cargo Hungária won 58–46 on aggregate.

52–52 on aggregate. DVSC-TvP won on away goals.

Semifinals

Győri Audi ETO KC won 69–50 on aggregate.

FTC-Rail Cargo Hungária won 57–49 on aggregate.

Third place

Érd won Third place, 46–41 on aggregate.

Finals

Győri Audi ETO KC won the FINAL, 53–43 on aggregate.

5th–8th placement matches 
Teams in bold won the placement matches. Numbers to the left of each team indicate the team's original playoff seeding. Numbers to the right indicate the score of each placement game.

5th–8th place semifinals

Dunaújvárosi Kohász KA won 55–47 on aggregate.

Fehérvár KC won 57–53 on aggregate.

7th place final

IPress Center Vác won 7th place, 62–58 on aggregate.

5th place final

Dunaújvárosi Kohász KA won 5th place, 61–54 on aggregate.

Relegation round

Schedule and results

Season statistics

Top goalscorers
Updated to games played on 26 May 2016.

Number of teams by counties

Hungarian clubs in European competitions
Women's EHF Champions League

FTC-Rail Cargo Hungária

Győri Audi ETO KC

 Women's EHF Cup

Dunaújvárosi Kohász KA

Siófok KC

Women's EHF Cup Winners' Cup
Érd

Final standing

See also
 2015–16 Magyar Kupa

References

External links
 Hungarian Handball Federaration 

Nemzeti Bajnokság I (women's handball)
2015–16 domestic handball leagues
Nemzeti Bajnoksag I Women
2015 in women's handball
2016 in women's handball